The Confédération africaine des travailleurs croyants de l'A.E.F ('African Confederation of Believing Workers of French Equatorial Africa', abbreviated C.A.T.C-A.E.F) was a trade union confederation in French Equatorial Africa. CATC was founded in Pointe-Noire January 2–6, 1957 by the branches of the French trade union centre C.F.T.C in Gabon, Moyen-Congo, Chad and Ubangi-Shari. Gilbert Pongault was the chairman of C.A.T.C-A.E.F. The C.A.T.C-A.E.F retained a separate organization from the West African C.A.T.C, which had been formed a few months earlier. The two organizations did however maintain contacts between each other, albeit the attitude of C.A.T.C.-A.E.F towards its counterpart was characterized by jealousy towards the stronger unions in West Africa.

C.A.T.C-A.E.F claimed to be an apolitical trade union organization. C.A.T.C-A.E.F supported pluralism in the trade union movement and the notion of Pan-Africa Christian trade unionism. However, by using the word 'Believer' instead of 'Christian' (as in the original C.F.T.C name), C.A.T.C-A.E.F sought to include Muslim workers. Still, C.A.T.C-A.E.F was funded by the Catholic Church and became an affiliate of the International Federation of Christian Trade Unions. And in spite of its apolitical profile, C.A.T.C-A.E.F did produce cadres for political parties, such as U.D.D.I.A in Congo.

In 1959 Pongault founded a new organization, Union panafricaine des travailleurs croyants ('Pan-African Union of Believing Workers' U.P.T.C), seeking to expand its activities beyond French Equatorial Africa. The local branches of C.A.T.C-A.E.F became national trade union centres, affiliated to UPTC. National trade union centres born out C.A.T.C-A.E.F were C.A.T.C-Congo, C.A.T.C-Gabon, C.A.T.C-Republique Centrafricaine, C.A.T.C-Tchad (later renamed the Confédération tchadienne de travail).

References

1957 establishments in French Equatorial Africa
Trade unions in French Equatorial Africa
Trade unions established in 1957
Trade unions disestablished in 1959